The Fairfield School District is a community public school district that serves students in pre-kindergarten through sixth grade from Fairfield Township, in Essex County, New Jersey, United States.

As of the 2018–19 school year, the district, comprised of two schools, had an enrollment of 669 students and 63.6 classroom teachers (on an FTE basis), for a student–teacher ratio of 10.5:1.

The district is classified by the New Jersey Department of Education as being in District Factor Group "GH", the third-highest of eight groupings. District Factor Groups organize districts statewide to allow comparison by common socioeconomic characteristics of the local districts. From lowest socioeconomic status to highest, the categories are A, B, CD, DE, FG, GH, I and J.

Students in public school for seventh through twelfth grades attend the West Essex Regional School District, a regional school district in western Essex County serving students from Essex Fells, Fairfield, North Caldwell and Roseland. Schools in the district (with 2018–19 enrollment data from the National Center for Education Statistics) are 
West Essex Middle School with 564 students in grades 7-8 and 
West Essex High School with 1,123 students in grades 9-12.

Schools
Schools in the district (with 2018–19 enrollment data from the National Center for Education Statistics) are:
Adlai E. Stevenson Elementary School with 402 students in pre-Kindergarten through third grade
Dr. Michael Trubucco, Principal
Winston S. Churchill School with 268 students in fourth through sixth grade
Ray Santana, Principal

Administration
Core members of the district's administration are:
Susan Ciccotelli, Superintendent
Lyanna Rios, Business Administrator / Board Secretary

Board of education
The district's board of education, comprised of nine members, sets policy and oversees the fiscal and educational operation of the district through its administration. As a Type II school district, the board's trustees are elected directly by voters to serve three-year terms of office on a staggered basis, with three seats up for election each year held (since 2012) as part of the November general election. The board appoints a superintendent to oversee the day-to-day operation of the district.

References

External links 
Fairfield School District

School Data for the Fairfield School District, National Center for Education Statistics
West Essex Regional School District

School Data for the West Essex Regional School District, National Center for Education Statistics

Fairfield Township, Essex County, New Jersey
School districts in Essex County, New Jersey
New Jersey District Factor Group GH